Callistosporium purpureomarginatum is a species of agaric fungus in the family Tricholomataceae. Found in the United States, it was officially described in 1996.

Taxonomy 
C. purpureomarginatum was classified by the mycologists Raymond M. Fatto and Alan E. Bessette in 1996.

Description 
C. purpureomarginatum is a small mushroom with a distinctive purplish red cap which discolours at it ages or dries.

Cap: 1-4cm. Starts convex before flattening with age. Stem: 1.5-4cm in height and 2-5mm in thickness. Gills: Purple brown, discolouring to yellow or olive whilst sometimes retaining purple fringes. Spore print: White. Spores: Smooth, ellipsoid. 4.7 x 2.5-4 μm. Taste: Indistinct or bitter. Smell: Indistinct.

References

External links

Fungi described in 1996
Fungi of the United States
Tricholomataceae
Fungi without expected TNC conservation status